is a Japanese basketball coach and former professional basketball player. A point guard, she played for JX Sunflowers of the Women's Japan Basketball League and the Phoenix Mercury in the WNBA. Her nickname is Shin.

Career
She started playing basketball influenced by her father who was a basketball coach of the Yamagata University. She was educated at and played for Nagoya College High School (currently Ōka Gakuen High School). While there, she helped the school win 7 national titles. After graduation in 2001, she joined Japan Energy basketball club. In the same year, she received her first call-up for the national team.

In 2004, she represented Japan at the 2004 Summer Olympics in Athens and became the youngest Japanese female basketball player at the Olympics ever.

In 2007, she became the first Japanese female player to sign a professional contract in the domestic leagues. In 2008, she signed a training camp contract with Phoenix Mercury. The club announced on May 16, 2008, that she made the opening day roster. She is the second Japanese player to play in the WNBA after Mikiko Hagiwara who also played for the Mercury from 1997 to 1998. She recorded 4 points and 1 assist in her WNBA debut on May 17, 2008, in the season opener, a 94–99 loss against the Los Angeles Sparks.

References

External links
 Yuko Oga official web site 
 

1982 births
Living people
Asian Games bronze medalists for Japan
Asian Games medalists in basketball
Basketball players at the 2004 Summer Olympics
Basketball players at the 2006 Asian Games
Basketball players at the 2010 Asian Games
Japanese expatriate basketball people in China
Japanese expatriate basketball people in the United States
Japanese women's basketball players
Medalists at the 2006 Asian Games
Medalists at the 2010 Asian Games
Olympic basketball players of Japan
People from Yamagata Prefecture
Phoenix Mercury players
Point guards
Shanxi Flame players